María Quintanal Zubizarreta (born December 17, 1969 in Biscay) is a sport shooter from Gran Canaria, Spain. The 2003 world champion in Double Trap, she competed at the 2004 Summer Olympics and won a silver medal in Trap. She also competed in the Double Trap event, but placed 13th.  She has also competed for the Dominican Republic in the Central American and Caribbean Games.

References

1969 births
Living people
Spanish female sport shooters
Olympic shooters of Spain
Shooters at the 1996 Summer Olympics
Shooters at the 2004 Summer Olympics
Olympic silver medalists for Spain
Trap and double trap shooters
Olympic medalists in shooting
Medalists at the 2004 Summer Olympics
20th-century Spanish women
21st-century Spanish women